Lamar Hunter Smith (born November 29, 1970) is a former American football running back. He played in the National Football League (NFL) for the Seattle Seahawks, Miami Dolphins, New Orleans Saints, and Carolina Panthers from 1994 to 2003. On December 30, 2000, Smith carried the ball a then NFL record 40 times for the Dolphins in a wildcard playoff game against the Indianapolis Colts. He finished with 209 yards rushing, including a 17-yard touchdown run in overtime to give the Dolphins a 23–17 victory, Miami's most recent playoff victory as of the 2022 season.

Education
Smith attended South Side High School in Fort Wayne. After high school, he attended Northeastern Oklahoma A&M College and then the University of Houston on scholarship for his final two years.

Professional career

Smith was selected in the third round with the 73rd overall pick by the Seattle Seahawks in the 1994 NFL Draft.

Drunk driving
Smith was charged with vehicular assault in 1994. He was drinking and driving prior to a car wreck that left teammate Mike Frier paralyzed from the neck down. The prosecutor noted that Smith had drank at least five beers and six-and-a-half ounces of Scotch shortly before his car struck a utility pole. Smith pleaded guilty to vehicular assault in 1996, and served 60 days in a work-release program. He was also ordered to give 35 to 50 percent of his NFL earnings to Frier over a seven-year period.

He was arrested on a second DUI charge in 2002 while playing for the Panthers.

NFL Europe
In 2007, he participated in a coaching internship program with NFL Europe.

NFL career statistics

Regular season

Postseason

References

External links 
 Lamar Smith statistics

1970 births
Living people
Players of American football from Fort Wayne, Indiana
African-American players of American football
American football running backs
Northeastern Oklahoma A&M Golden Norsemen football players
Houston Cougars football players
Seattle Seahawks players
Miami Dolphins players
New Orleans Saints players
Carolina Panthers players
21st-century African-American sportspeople
20th-century African-American sportspeople